Kleemannia is a genus of mites in the family Ameroseiidae. There are more than 20 described species in Kleemannia.

Species
These 23 species belong to the genus Kleemannia:

 Kleemannia bella Barilo, 1987
 Kleemannia bengalensis Bhattacharyya, 1972
 Kleemannia bisetae Karg, 1994
 Kleemannia curvata Gu, Wang & Bai, 1989
 Kleemannia delicata Berlese, 1918
 Kleemannia dipankari Bhattacharyya, 2004
 Kleemannia elegans Bernhard, 1963
 Kleemannia guyimingi Ma, 1997
 Kleemannia insignis Bernhard, 1963
 Kleemannia kosi El-Badry, Nasr & Hafez, 1979
 Kleemannia longisetosa Ye & Ma, 1993
 Kleemannia mineiro Narita, Bernardi & Moraes, 2013
 Kleemannia multus Gu, Wang & Bai, 1989
 Kleemannia nova Nasr & Abou-Awad, 1986
 Kleemannia parplumosa Nasr & Abou-Awad, 1986
 Kleemannia pennata Fox, 1949
 Kleemannia pinicola Ishikawa, 1972
 Kleemannia plumea Oudemans, 1930
 Kleemannia plumosoides Gu, Wang & Bai, 1989
 Kleemannia plumosus (Oudemans, 1902)
 Kleemannia reticulata Kruger & Loots, 1980
 Kleemannia tenella Berlese, 1916
 Kleemannia wahabi Ibrahim & Abdel-Samed, 1992

References

External links

 

Acari